The Grenadiers is an infantry regiment of the Indian Army, formerly part of the Bombay Army and later the pre-independence British Indian Army, when the regiment was known as the 4th Bombay Grenadiers. It has distinguished itself during the two world wars and also since the Independence of India. The regiment has won many battle honours and gallantry awards, and is considered to be one of India's most decorated regiments with three Param Vir Chakra awardees in three different conflicts.

History

Early history
The oldest grenadier regiment of the armies in the Commonwealth belongs to the Indian Army. The concept of 'Grenadiers' evolved from the practice of selecting the bravest and strongest men for the most dangerous tasks in combat. The Grenadiers have the longest unbroken record of existence in the Indian Army.

The history of the Indian Grenadiers is linked to the troops recruited for the army of the Bombay Presidency. The very first mention of a grenadier company hails back to 1684, when a little army of English troops, which had taken possession of the island of Bombay and comprising three companies of Europeans and local Christians, had a grenadier company, but nothing was heard about this unit subsequently. In 1710, the Bombay Army consisted of five companies of "Europeans, topasses (Indian Christians), and coffrees (Kaffirs)" of which the first company was a European grenadier company. This company was merged into the Bombay European Regiment, which was later disbanded. In 1757, Robert Clive had raised the 1st Regiment of the Bengal Native Infantry of which two companies were grenadier companies, however, no regiments of grenadiers were formed from the Bengal Army until a battalion was formed in 1779.

In 1759, as a response to French maneuvering in South India, the strength of the Bombay Army was enhanced, and the first company of sepoy grenadiers was raised with the best of Bombay sepoys "paying a regard to those having families on the island". It had only native officers and all sepoys wore red coats faced with blue. Later on, an adjutant was appointed to the corps.

Later the Bombay Army comprised a number of sepoy battalions, each having one or two grenadier companies. These were clubbed together as a composite battalion comprising the grenadier companies of the Bombay sepoy battalions, and they won the famous battle of Talegaon in 1778. So impressive was the performance of this composite battalion that the Bombay Presidency ordered the permanent raising of a grenadier battalion which duly took place on 12 March 1779, thirty-six years before the first time that a British battalion was given the honour of calling itself "grenadiers". The Governor General of Bombay made an Order dated 12 November 1779, according to which the grenadier companies of the following regiments combined to form the very first Grenadier Regiment in the world, namely "The Grenadier Battalion, First Regiment of Infantry":
 1st Sepoy Battalion
 2nd Sepoy Battalion
 3rd Sepoy Battalion
 4th Sepoy Battalion
 5th Sepoy Battalion
 6th Sepoy Battalion
 Marine Battalion (two companies of grenadiers)

4th Bombay Grenadiers

The 4th Bombay Grenadiers were an infantry regiment of the pre-independence Indian Army, formed on 1 March 1922 as part of the reforms of the Indian Army that took place after the end of the First World War. Following this, the Regiment spent the next fifteen years serving in the British Somaliland protectorate in present-day Somaliland, as well as in China and on the North-West Frontier. The 3rd, 4th and 5th Battalions were all disbanded and the 10th Battalion amalgamated with the 10th Battalion, Jat Regiment to form a Combined Training Centre at Bareilly. Following the Second World War they were one of the regiments allocated to the new Indian Army and renamed The Grenadiers

The regiment consisted of six battalions, all former regiments themselves. These were:

1st Battalion - Formerly the 101st Grenadiers.
2nd Battalion - Formerly the 102nd King Edward's Own Grenadiers
3rd Battalion - Formerly the 108th Infantry 
4th Battalion - Formerly the 109th Infantry
5th Battalion - Formerly the 112th Infantry
10th (Training) Battalion - Formerly the 113th Infantry

Second World War

At the beginning of the Second World War there were only two battalions of the Regiment, the 1st and 2nd. This was soon changed, though, as a number of battalions were raised for wartime service, including: 3rd, 4th, 5th, 6th, 14th, 25th, 26th and 27th Battalions. The 10th (Training Battalion) was also de-linked from the Jat Regiment. Some of these battalions were to be garrison or rear area troops only, while others went on to serve with distinction in a number of theatres during the war including the Middle East and Burma, notably during the Arakan campaigns and at Kohima.

The 4th Grenadiers formed the motorised infantry element of the Indian Armoured and Tank brigades, distinguishing themselves as 'tank escort' infantry protecting tanks against sniper attack in jungle conditions:

1/4th Battalion, 252nd Indian Armoured Brigade, 31st Indian Armoured Division
2/4th Battalion, 50th Indian Tank Brigade
3/4th Battalion, 254th Indian Tank Brigade
4/4th Battalion, 255th Indian Tank Brigade

Partition
In October 1945, the Indian infantry regiments lost their numerical designation and the regiment was re-designated as the Indian Grenadiers, thus severing its last link with the erstwhile Bombay Army (Special Indian Army Order 132/S/45). Following the partition of India, the regiment was allotted to India. The active units at that time were the 1st, 2nd, 3rd, 4th and 25th. The Muslim troops in the regiment were allotted to Pakistan. Dogras from 5 Baluch joined the 1st battalion, The Frontier Force Rifles to 2nd battalion, and from 1/16 Punjab to the 4th battalion.

Regimental battalions

The Grenadiers consists of 23 battalions, four Rashtriya Rifles battalions and two Territorial Army battalions -

§ indicates former units.

Class composition
1923 - Rajputana Mussalmans, Rajputana Jats, Mahrattas, Mers and Merats
1946 - Jats from the Punjab, United Provinces, Rajputana and Central India states, Hindustani Mussalmans from Ambala Civil Division, Rajputana, United Provinces, Central India states and the Deccan.
Present - Rajputs, Kaimkhanis, Hindustani Mussalmans, Dogras, Gujjar, Ahir, Mena, Gujratis, Jats.

Battle honours

Battle Honours (Pre-Independence)
Prior to Indian independence, the Regiment had won many battle honours as part of the British Indian Army. These battle honour include:

Pre-World War I

 Mangalore – 1784
 Mysore – 1786
 Srirangapatnam – 1799
 Egypt – 1802
 Koregaon – 1818
 Beni Boo Alli – 1821
 Kirkee – 1827
 Hyderabad – 1831–43
 Multan
 Meeane – 1843
 Punjab – 1848
 Central India – 1858
 Abyssinia – 1868
 Kandahar 1880
 Afghanistan 1878–80
 Burma 1885–87
 Somaliland (Dharatol) – 1901–04
 Afghanistan 1919

World War I

 East Africa 1914–16
 Egypt – 1916–17
 Baghdad – 1917
 Kut-Al-Amara – 1917
 Gaza – 1917
 Battle of Sharqat – 1918
 Megiddo
 Nablus – 1918
 Palestine 1917–18
 Mesopotamia – 1915–18
 Aden – 1914–19
 Afghanistan 1919
 Tigris – 1919

World War II

 Kohima – 1944
 Kalewa – 1944
 Naga Village – 1944
 Fort Dufferin, Mandalay – 1945
 Pwabwe – 1945
 Capture of Meiktila – 1945
 Defense of Meiktila – 1945
 Pegu – 1945
 Taungtha – 1945

Battle Honours (Post-Independence)
Since 1947, the Regiment has won the following battle honours as part of the Indian Army:

 Gurais – 1948
 Asal Uttar – 1965
 Jarpal – 1971
 Chakra – 1971
 Tololing & Tiger Hill (Kargil War) – 1999

Decorations
The Grenadiers have the unique and distinct honour of having the most number of Param Vir Chakras, India's highest medal for gallantry, among all the Indian Army's Infantry Regiments. Of note also, is the fact that prior to independence, British officers serving with The Grenadiers won four Victoria Crosses. Members of the Regiment have also received a number of other decorations prior to independence.

Pre independence
Victoria Cross
 Captain George Murray Rolland, 22 April 1903, Daratoleh, Somaliland

1914-1921

Military Cross
 Jemadar Pola Khan, 101st Grenadiers, Egypt
 Subedar Jiwan Khan, 101st Grenadiers, Egypt and Aden (twice)
 Subedar Kasianth Mane, 101st Grenadiers, Egypt 

Order of British India
 Subedar Major Martand Rao Mohite, 101st Grenadiers, Egypt
 Subedar Agdi Singh, 102nd Grenadiers, Mesopotamia

Indian Order of Merit
 Sepoy Fazil Khan, 101st Grenadiers, East Africa
 Sepoy Sowaz Khan, 101st Grenadiers, East Africa
 Subedar Rahim Khan, 101st Grenadiers, Egypt
 Subedar Ahmed Din, 101st Grenadiers, Egypt
 Colour Havildar Shah Muhammad, 101st Grenadiers, Egypt
 Subedar Jafar Ali, 102nd Grenadiers, Muscat
 Sepoy Nand Ram, 102nd Grenadiers, Muscat
 Subedar Ganga Ram Singh, 102nd Grenadiers, Mesopotamia
 Subedar Muhammad Ali, 102nd Grenadiers, Mesopotamia
 Jemadar Ganga Ram, 102nd Grenadiers, Mesopotamia
 Havildar Jaffar Ali, 102nd Grenadiers, Waziristan
 Naik Shivlal Dalal (1933)

Indian Distinguished Service Medal
 Lance Naik Abdul Sattar Khan, Temporary Lance Naik Muhammad Khan, 101st Grenadiers, Egypt
 Havildar Karan Singh, Havildar Ganga Ram, Private Sultan Ahmad, Havildar Tula Ram, Havildar Tula Ram, Havildar Mansare Ali, Private Sheo Ram, Havildar Sanwal Ram, Private Shedu Ram, Private Sirdara Ram, Private Surja Ram, Jemadar Khan Muhammad, Sepoy Ahmad Khan, Sepoy Girdhari Ram, Sepoy Tulsi Ram, Private Feroz Khan, Havildar Ram Diyal Singh, Naik Niyamat Khan (all in Mesopotamia), Private Karam Dad Khan (Muscat), Lance Naik Hoti Singh (Baluchistan), Subedar Mansar Ali (Pishin Moveable Column) 102nd Grenadiers

Indian Meritorious Service Medal
 84 medals - 101st Grenadiers, Egypt, Aden, Somaliland, India
 12 medals - 102nd Grenadiers, Mesopotamia, India, Baluchistan

World War II
Member of the Most Excellent Order of the British Empire (MBE) 
 Subedar Major Shamshad Khan, 4th Bombay Grenadiers

Mentioned in dispatches
 Major T H Waumsley, 4th Bombay Grenadiers
 Major E R S Dods,  4th Bombay Grenadiers

Post independence
Param Vir Chakra

 Company Quarter Master Havildar Abdul Hamid, 4th Grenadiers, 1965.
 Major Hoshiar Singh, 3rd Grenadiers, 1971.
 Grenadier Yogendra Singh Yadav, 18th Grenadiers, 1999.

Ashok Chakra
 Second Lieutenant Rakesh Singh, 22nd Grenadiers, 1993
 Major Rajiv Kumar Joon , 22nd Grenadiers, 1995

Maha Vir Chakra
 2nd Lieutenant Gopala Krishna Venkatesa Prasanna Rao, (Posthumous), 4th Grenadiers, Sino-Indian War, 1962
 Brigadier Rai Singh Yadav, 2nd Grenadiers, Nathu La and Cho La clashes 1967.
 Lieutenant General Ved Prakash Airy, 3rd Grenadiers, Indo-Pak War of 1971 (Battle of Basantar).
 Major Dharam Vir Singh, 8th Grenadiers, Indo-Pak War of 1971.
 Major General Antony Harold Edward Michigan, Indo-Pak War of 1971.
 Major Rajesh Singh Adhikari, (Posthumous), 18th Grenadiers, Kargil War (Operation Vijay) 1999.
 Colonel Balwan Singh, 18th Grenadiers, Kargil War (Operation Vijay) 1999.

Kirti Chakra
 Grenadier Daryao Singh, 1948
 Grenadier Gopal Singh (Posthumous), 1981
 Grenadier Bajrang Singh (Posthumous), 1981
 Naik Prakash Chand, 1990
 Lieutenant Ravinder Chikara (Posthumous), 2001
 Grenadier Anil Kumar (Posthumous), 2003
 Colonel Gurbir Singh Sarna (Posthumous), 2006
 Major Rajinder Kumar Sharma, 2008

Notable General Officers
Vice Chief of the Army Staff - Lieutenant General Stanley Leslie Menezes, 
Army Commanders (GOC-in-C) - Lieutenant General Y. N. Sharma (Central Command)
Corps Commanders (GOC) - Lieutenant Generals Y.S. Tomar (I Corps); Rajeev Sirohi (III Corps); Stanley Leslie Menezes, Shakti Gurung, Gurpal Singh Sangha (all IV Corps); Y.N. Sharma (XII Corps); Sarabjit Singh Dhillon (XV Corps); Lalit Kumar Pandey (XVII Corps).

References & notes

Bibliography
 
 
 
 
 Moberly, F.J. (1923). Official History of the War: Mesopotamia Campaign, Imperial War Museum. 
 Singh, Rajendra (1969) History of the Grenadiers
 Singh, Rajendra (1955) Organisation and Administration in the Indian Army
 Palsokar, R.D. (1980) The Grenadiers, a Tradition of Valour, The Grenadiers Regimental Centre, Jabalpur

See also
 List of regiments of the Indian Army
 British Indian Army
 Indian Army

External links
 Official Website of Indian Army
 bharat-rakshak.com – The Grenadiers 
 Indian Grenadiers Regiment
 The Bombay Grenadiers
 2nd Battalion, 4th Bombay Grenadiers (King Edward's Own), Formerly the 102nd King Edward's Own Grenadiers, Historical Record of the Regiment, 1796-1933

Military units and formations established in 1947
Infantry regiments of the Indian Army from 1947
Grenadier regiments
Indian World War I regiments
Indian World War II regiments
Military units and formations in Burma in World War II